Trinchesia sibogae is a species of sea slug, an aeolid nudibranch, a marine gastropod mollusc in the family Trinchesiidae.

Distribution
This species was described from Kangean Island, Indonesia. Trinchesia sibogae is widespread throughout the tropical waters of the Indo-West Pacific region. This species is large for this family, with a maximum size of 35 mm length.

References

 Marshall, J. G. and R. C. Willan. 1999. Nudibranchs of Heron Island, Great Barrier Reef : a survey of the Opisthobranchia (sea slugs) of Heron and Wistari Reefs. Backhuys: Leiden. x, 257 pp
 Miller, M. C.; Willan, R. C. (2005). A redescription and taxonomic reappraisal of the Indo-Pacific aeolid nudibranch Trinchesia sibogae (Bergh, 1905)(Gastropoda, Opisthobranchia). Vita Malacologica. 3: 69-75

External links
 McDonald, G. R. (2009). Nudibranch Systematic Index, second edition. University of California Santa Cruz: Institute of Marine Sciences

Trinchesiidae
Gastropods described in 1905